McDonald Theatre is a theater and music venue in Eugene, Oregon, United States. Opened in 1925 as a movie house, the building was converted to a theater for performing arts, and is still in business. The theater is listed on the National Register of Historic Places.

See also
List of Registered Historic Places in Lane County, Oregon
List of Registered Historic Places in Oregon

External links
McDonald Theatre (official website)

Buildings and structures in Eugene, Oregon
Culture of Eugene, Oregon
National Register of Historic Places in Eugene, Oregon
Theatres in Oregon
Theatres on the National Register of Historic Places in Oregon
Tourist attractions in Eugene, Oregon
1925 establishments in Oregon